Yona Roshen Knight-Wisdom (born 12 May 1995) is a Jamaican diver, who competed at the 2016 and 2020 Summer Olympics, and came second in the 1 metre springboard event at the 2019 Pan American Games. He was the first Jamaican male diver at an Olympic Games.

Personal life
Knight-Wisdom was born in Leeds, UK, but competes for Jamaica. His father, Trevor Wisdom, is from Jamaica and his mother, Grace Knight, is from Barbados. Knight-Wisdom studied at Leeds Grammar School, and is a graduate of Leeds Beckett University, where he studied sport and exercise science.

Career
Knight-Wisdom's diving career began in 2004; he has said that he took up the sport after seeing it at the 2004 Summer Olympic Games. He started diving for City of Leeds Diving club along with British divers Jack Laugher, Chris Mears, Rebecca Gallantree and Alicia Blagg. Knight-Wisdom has said of himself that "I am a 190 cm tall, 90 kg heavy, black diver... Watch a diving event and that is not something you will see very often." In 2012, Knight-Wisdom decided to represent Jamaica; he had been eligible to compete for Barbados or Great Britain, but had struggled to get in the British team. Knight-Wisdom competed at the 2014 Commonwealth Games, making him Jamaica's first-ever male Commonwealth diving competitor; Knight-Wisdom finished fifth in the 1 metre springboard event, and eleventh in the 3 metre springboard event. He competed at the 2015 World Aquatics Championships.

Knight-Wisdom competed in the 2016 FINA Diving World Cup; after qualifying for the semi-finals by finishing seventeenth, he qualified for the 2016 Summer Olympics, becoming the first male Jamaican diver at the Olympics, as well as the first male diver from any Caribbean nation. Knight-Wisdom finished second in the Diving World Cup final. After qualifying for Rio 2016, Knight-Wisdom was named Leeds Beckett University Sportsman of the Year for 2016.

Knight-Wisdom came second in the 1 metre springboard event at the 2019 Pan American Games. He competed in the 3 metre springboard event at the delayed 2020 Summer Olympics. He finished 15th in the semi-final, and did not progress to the final. He competed at the 2022 Commonwealth Games where he came 5th in the Men's 1 metre springboard event and 6th in the Men's 3 metre springboard event.

Notes

References

External links
 

English male divers
Jamaican male divers
Living people
1995 births
Divers at the 2014 Commonwealth Games
Commonwealth Games competitors for Jamaica
Divers at the 2016 Summer Olympics
Divers at the 2018 Commonwealth Games
Divers at the 2022 Commonwealth Games
Sportspeople from Leeds
Alumni of Leeds Beckett University
Olympic divers of Jamaica
English sportspeople of Jamaican descent
English sportspeople of Barbadian descent
Divers at the 2015 Pan American Games
Pan American Games medalists in diving
Pan American Games silver medalists for Jamaica
Divers at the 2019 Pan American Games
Medalists at the 2019 Pan American Games
Divers at the 2020 Summer Olympics